The COG2827 RNA motif is a conserved RNA structure that was discovered by bioinformatics.
COG2827 motifs are found in Clostridiales.

It is ambiguous whether COG2827 RNAs function as cis-regulatory elements or whether they operate in trans.  Most COG2827 RNAs occur upstream of genes encoding GIY-YIG endonucleases.  Although these genes are often located inside self-splicing introns, the COG2827 RNA motif is much smaller and simpler than known self-splicing introns, and is therefore unlikely to function as a ribozyme.

References

Non-coding RNA